The Asian School, is a co-ed Boarding School in Dehradun with both Day Boarding and Full Boarding Facilities. The School was established in 2000, by Mr. Amarjeet Juneja under the umbrella of the Asian Educational Charitable Trust.

Affiliation 
The School is affiliated with Central Board of Secondary Education (CBSE) and International Baccalaureate since 2000 and 2020.

Academics 
The Asian School offers English medium, co-ed education from classes Nursery to XII Class.

Sports 
The School has sport facilities like two large playing fields, basketball, tennis, badminton courts, a 25-meter swimming pool and a gymnasium.
Sports include Athletics, Badminton, Basketball, Baseball, Boxing, Cricket, Cross Country, Gymnastics, Hockey, Horse Riding, Karate, Soccer, Swimming, Table Tennis, Skating and Shooting.

References

External links 
 Official website
Best Boarding School in  Dehradun

International schools in India
Boarding schools in Uttarakhand
High schools and secondary schools in Uttarakhand
Schools in Dehradun
Educational institutions established in 2000
2000 establishments in Uttarakhand